The Tyrell Football League (TFL) was an Australian rules football and competition that finished in 1978 with clubs based in the Mallee region of Victoria, Australia. The league featured three grades in the Australian rules football competition, being First-Grade, Reserve-Grade and Under 16s (starting in 1966).

History
The Tyrrell Football League was formed in 1946 and competed through to 1978 until the league folded and all clubs joined new and neighbouring leagues in the area.

Clubs

Premierships

Mallee (Victoria)
Defunct Australian rules football competitions in Victoria (Australia)